The 2011 Clydesdale Bank 40 tournament was the second season of the ECB 40 limited overs cricket competition for the English and Welsh first-class counties. In addition to the 18 counties, Scotland and the Netherlands took part, as well as the Unicorns, a team of players who did not have first-class contracts.

The competition consisted of three groups of seven teams, from which the top team from each group, plus the best second-placed team, progressed to the semi-finals. The groups were allocated randomly.

Fixtures and results

Group stage

Group A

April

May

July

August

Group B

April

May

July

August

Group C

April

May

July

August

Knockout stage

Semi-finals

Final

Statistics

Highest team totals
The following table lists the six highest team scores in the season.

Most runs
The top five highest run scorers (total runs) in the season are included in this table.

Highest scores
This table contains the top five highest scores of the season made by a batsman in a single innings.

Most wickets
The following table contains the five leading wicket-takers of the season.

Best bowling figures
This table lists the top five players with the best bowling figures in the season.

See also
 ECB 40

References

ECB 40
Clydesdale Bank 40
2011 in cricket